

Otto Baum (15 November 1911 – 18 June 1998) was a high-ranking commander (Oberführer) of the Waffen-SS during World War II. He was a recipient of the Knight's Cross of the Iron Cross with Oak Leaves and Swords of Nazi Germany.

Life and career
Baum was born on 15 November 1911 in Hechingen-Stetten, a son of a merchant. From 1930 to 1932, he studied two semesters of agriculture at the University of Hohenheim. 
He served as a battalion commander in 3rd SS Totenkopf Infantry Regiment during the Operation Barbarossa, invasion of the Soviet Union. After recovering from severe wounds in 1943, he was promoted to regimental commander, and eventually reached the rank of SS-Oberführer. He took command of the SS Division Das Reich in July 1944, and saw action in the Falaise Pocket.

Awards
SA Sports Badge in Bronze, 1 December 1936
Degen (SS), 13 September 1936
Julleuchter, December 1936
SS-Ehrenring, 1 December 1937
Anschluss Medal, 13 March 1938
1939 Iron Cross 2nd Class, 25 September 1939
1939 Iron Cross 1st Class, 15 June 1940
Infantry Assault Badge in Bronze, 3 October 1940
Tank Destruction Badge
German Cross in Gold, 26 December 1941 as SS-Sturmbannführer in the III./SS-Infanterie-Regiment 3
Eastern Front Medal, 1942
Wound Badge in Silver, 21 August 1943
Demyansk Shield, 31 December 1943
Knight's Cross of the Iron Cross with Oak Leaves and Swords
 Knight's Cross on 8 May 1942 as SS-Sturmbannführer and commander of the III./SS-Totenkopf-Infanterie-Regiment 3
 277th Oak Leaves on 22 August 1943 as SS-Obersturmbannführer and commander of SS-Panzergrenadier-Regiment "Thule".
 95th Swords on 2 September 1944 as SS-Standartenführer and commander 2. SS-Panzer-Division "Das Reich"

References
Notes

Bibliography
 
 
 
 
 
 
 
 

1911 births
1998 deaths
Nazi Party members
People from Hechingen
People from the Province of Hohenzollern
SS-Oberführer
Waffen-SS personnel
Recipients of the Gold German Cross
Recipients of the Knight's Cross of the Iron Cross with Oak Leaves and Swords